Simon Marklund (born 14 September 1999) is a Swedish footballer who plays as a midfielder for Ranheim.

References

External links
 Simon Marklund at Fotbolltransfers 
 

1999 births
Living people
Association football midfielders
Swedish footballers
Sweden youth international footballers
Åtvidabergs FF players
Allsvenskan players
Ettan Fotboll players
Superettan players
Kongsvinger IL Toppfotball players
Norwegian First Division players
Swedish expatriate footballers
Expatriate footballers in Norway
Swedish expatriate sportspeople in Norway